Indian Springs, California may refer to:
 Indian Springs, Los Angeles County, California
 Indian Springs, Madera County, California, unincorporated community
 Indian Springs, Mendocino County, California
 Indian Springs, Nevada County, California, ghost town